Marsha is a variant spelling of Marcia. Notable people with the name include:

Marsha Ambrosius (born 1977), former member of the English band duo Floetry
Marsha Arzberger (born 1937), Democratic politician
Marsha Barbour, first lady of the U.S. state of Mississippi since 2004
Marsha Berzon (born 1945), federal appeals judge who has served on the Ninth Circuit Court of Appeals since 2000
Marsha Blackburn (born 1952), Tennessee politician
Marsha Canham (born 1950), Canadian writer of historical romance novels
Marsha Cheeks (born 1956), African-American politician from the U.S. state of Michigan
Marsha Clark, American actress best known for roles in soap operas
Marsha Coleman-Adebayo, senior policy analyst for the United States Environmental Protection Agency
Marsha Collier, author, radio personality and educator in making money on eBay and online
Marsha J. Evans (born 1947), retired Rear Admiral in the United States Navy
Marsha Farney (born 1958), American politician
Marsha Feinland, third-party candidate (Peace and Freedom Party) for U.S. president in 1996
Marsha Harris, winner of the 1998 Walter Byers Award as the nation's top female scholar-athlete
Marsha Henderson, Saint Kitts and Nevis politician
Marsha Hunt (1917–2022), American film, stage and television actress
Marsha Hunt (born 1946), American model, singer, novelist and actress
Marsha Ivins (born 1951), American astronaut and a veteran of five space shuttle missions
Marsha P. Johnson (1945–1992), African American gay liberation activist, participant in the Stonewall riots
Marsha I. Lester, American physical chemist
Marsha M. Linehan (born 1943), American psychologist and author
Marsha Looper (born 1959), Colorado legislator
Marsha Marescia (born 1983), field hockey player from South Africa
Marsha Mason (born 1942), American actress and television director
Marsha Milan Londoh (born 1985), Malaysian singer and actress
Marsha Miller (born 1969), retired beach volleyball player from the United States
Marsha Miro, wrote art news for the Detroit Free Press in the late 20th century
Marsha Norman (born 1947), American playwright, screenwriter, and novelist
Marsha J. Pechman (born 1951), United States federal judge
Marsha Shandur (born 1977), radio presenter, DJ and music manager, who presents on Xfm London and Xfm Manchester
Marsha Sharp (born 1952), former head coach of Texas Tech University's women's basketball team, the Lady Raiders
Marsha Singh (born 1954), politician in the United Kingdom
Marsha Skrypuch (born 1954), Ukrainian Canadian children's writer who lives in Brantford, Ontario
Marsha Stevens (born 1952), Christian singer, musician, songwriter and recording artist
Marsha Swails (born 1952), Minnesota politician and a member of the Minnesota House of Representatives
Marsha Thomason (born 1976), British actress
Marsha Thomson (born 1955), Australian politician
Marsha Thornton (born 1964), American country music singer
Marsha Vadhanapanich (born 1970), Thai singer, model and actress
Marsha Waggoner (born 1948), American professional poker player
Marsha Warfield (born 1954), American actress and comedian

See also
John En Marsha, prime time comedy sitcom in the Philippines during the 1980s
Marsha, Queen of Diamonds, the fifty-seventh episode of the Batman television series
Marsha Stern Talmudical Academy, Orthodox Jewish day school in the Washington Heights neighborhood in  Manhattan
Marsha's Scheme of Diamonds, the fifty-eighth episode of the Batman television series
The Marsha Warfield Show, daytime talk show that aired for two seasons on NBC from 1990 to 1991
Marsha: Queen of the Mermaids, a character from The Lego Movie and The Lego Movie 2: The Second Part
 Marsha, a character in the British television programme Roary the Racing Car

English feminine given names